Fred Bills was an Australian rules footballer for the West Torrens Football Club in the South Australian National Football League. A ruckman, he played 313 games for the club

References

West Torrens Football Club players
South Australian Football Hall of Fame inductees